Bruchhausen is a municipality in the district of Neuwied, in Rhineland-Palatinate, Germany.

References 

Neuwied (district)